

This is a list of the National Register of Historic Places listings in Crawford County, Arkansas.

This is intended to be a complete list of the properties and districts on the National Register of Historic Places in Crawford County, Arkansas, United States. The locations of National Register properties and districts for which the latitude and longitude coordinates are included below, may be seen in a map.

There are 33 properties and districts listed on the National Register in the county. Another six properties were once listed but have been removed.

Current listings

|}

Former listing

|}

See also

List of National Historic Landmarks in Arkansas
National Register of Historic Places listings in Arkansas

References

 
Crawford County